The New Jersey Brigade Encampment Site, also called the New Jersey Brigade Area, was used by the Continental Army in the winter of 1779–80, during the American Revolutionary War. The site is located in Bernardsville, Somerset County, New Jersey and extends into  Harding Township, Morris County. About 1,300 men of the New Jersey Brigade were encamped here. It is one of four contributing sites of the Morristown National Historical Park. The Cross Estate Gardens property was added in 1975.

The Patriots' Path, also known as the New Jersey Brigade Trail here, is needed to access the marked historical sites. One trailhead is on Hardscrabble Road, another on Jockey Hollow Road.

History
During the "Hard Winter" of 1779–80, the Continental Army encamped at nearby Jockey Hollow except for the New Jersey Brigade, which encamped here. The New Jersey units were the 1st New Jersey Regiment, 2nd New Jersey Regiment, 3rd New Jersey Regiment and Spencer's Regiment.

Gallery

References

External links
 
 
 
 

Bernardsville, New Jersey
Harding Township, New Jersey
Morristown National Historical Park
National Register of Historic Places in Morris County, New Jersey
National Register of Historic Places in Somerset County, New Jersey
Historic district contributing properties in New Jersey
New Jersey Register of Historic Places